Steve Lombard is a fictional character appearing in American comic books published by DC Comics.

Steve Lombard made his cinematic debut in the DC Extended Universe in the 2013 film Man of Steel, played by Michael Kelly.

Publication history
Steve Lombard first appeared in Superman #264 (June 1973) in a story written by Cary Bates and penciled by Curt Swan. When editor Julius Schwartz suggested adding a sportscaster to Clark Kent's news reporter, Bates decided to create a workplace adversary for Kent to contrast with Kent's friendly relationship with the other characters, drawing partial inspiration from the character Ted Baxter of The Mary Tyler Moore Show. Lombard's physical model was real-life football star Joe Namath.

For several years after Steve Lombard's debut, he appeared in nearly every published Superman story. Action Comics writer Martin Pasko later attempted to explain the character's popularity: 

Bates wrote Steve Lombard out of the comic in Superman #384, though his final pre-Crisis on Infinite Earths appearance was not until Superman #413.

Fictional character biography

Pre-Crisis
In Pre-Crisis continuity, Steve "The Slinger" Lombard is a quarterback for the fictional NFL team the Metropolis Meteors. The day before his team is to play in the Super Bowl, Steve exacerbates existing injuries to his knees while saving a baby falling from a building. An experimental radiation treatment cures his knees, but also produces an energy being resembling Lombard in his football uniform. The energy being responds to Lombard's thoughts and begins scoring touchdowns in his place, as Lombard had missed most of the game due to his accident. Initially taking credit for the energy being's performance, Lombard publicly confesses the truth after the being goes on a rampage and has to be stopped by Superman. Steve resigns from the Meteors and retires from football over his actions, leading Morgan Edge to hire him as a sportscaster for Galaxy Broadcasting, working alongside anchor Clark Kent on the Six O'Clock News.

Steve is portrayed as brash and arrogant, and often plays childish pranks on Clark Kent (addressing him as "Clarkie"), which Kent usually counters with the subtle use of his super-powers. However, Steve also considers Clark one of his few real friends, since he takes Steve's behavior in stride and never bears him a grudge. Steve has a brother named Vernon, who is a doctor, and a nephew named Jaime. Steve also has an aunt, Kaye Daye, who is a mystery novelist who works with the Mystery Analysts of Gotham City. Morgan Edge ultimately fires Steve after many years due to his declining popularity with the viewing audience. Steve goes to Clark's apartment seeking solace, only to be attacked by a former college roommate who did not shrug off Steve's pranks as well as Clark did, and obtained superhuman powers to get revenge. In a rare display of genuine courage and humanity, Steve forces Clark to safety before confronting his opponent, although Clark returns as Superman and rescues Steve.

Post-Crisis
Lombard was not part of the original reboot of the Superman storyline that began in John Byrne's 1986 The Man of Steel mini-series. His first Post-Crisis appearance is as a news anchor on WGBS-TV in The Adventures of Superman #467 (June 1990).

As of the June 2008 storyline, Steve works for the Daily Planet, as the editor of the Sports section. Perry White states Steve has recently returned to the paper, so it can be assumed that Steve used to work there before leaving to work for WGBS. Action Comics Annual #11 (May 2008) gives the following information on Steve: "Sports Reporter. Steve Lombard played football in high school, college, and briefly for the pros. He sees himself as a man's man, everything Clark Kent is not in fact. He is a walking encyclopedia of sports trivia and put-downs. Lombard cannot figure out why Lois Lane does not throw herself at him". It is also stated that Steve often butts heads with coworker Ron Troupe.

In the 2008 "Brainiac" storyline, he makes a crude sexual advance to Lois right in front of Clark. He insults Ron Troupe's choice of subject matter, thinking articles critical of sports means Ron 'hates' them. He takes great joy in assaulting colleagues with a football, laughing at their torment. However, once actual danger arises he is quick to take charge and work with others in order to make sure everyone is safe. For example, he and Ron save Cat Grant's life.

The 2009-2010 miniseries Superman: Secret Origin established that Lombard, in post-Infinite Crisis continuity, was already on the staff of the Daily Planet when Clark began working at the newspaper.

Steve's first 'Rebirth' appearance is a crude confrontation with Lois in the Daily Planet newsroom.

Steve is shot in the shoulder when he attempts to stop a crazed gunman from killing various Daily Planet employees. He is later seen being led away from the building.

The cosmic-level threat, the H-Dial, manifests itself in a superpowered being called the Early Adopter appearing in the middle of the Daily Planet newsroom. Steve picks a fight with him, but the fight ends upon the arrival of teenaged martial artist mutants.

Alternate versions

Earth-Two
There was an Earth-Two version called Steve Bard who appeared in the 'Mr. & Mrs. Superman' stories in the Superman Family title. He appeared first in Superman #29, as a jokester, resembling the Prankster.

Smallville
Steve Lombard is featured in the Smallville Season 11 digital comic based on the TV series who is possessed by Eclipso. While a Steve Lombard is said to have recently gone to the Daily Star in the episode "Booster", leaving the Daily Planet, this Steve Lombard is a low-level Daily Planet reporter, who works in the basement of the building.

All-Star Superman
Steve Lombard appears as a minor supporting character in Grant Morrison's limited series All-Star Superman. This incarnation works as a sportswriter at the Daily Planet. His character and appearance are similar to that of the post-Crisis Lombard. In All-Star Superman #7, Steve proves immune to the Bizarro virus due to his use of performance-enhancing drugs. In the same issue, he risks his life to save fellow employees from danger. He also wears a toupee, but he denies doing so.

In other media

Television
 While not actually appearing on the show, Steve is referenced in the Smallville episode "Booster" as a former Daily Planet reporter, whom recently walked over to the Daily Star.
 Steve appears without any lines in the DC Super Hero Girls episode "#EmperorPenguin" as a current pro football quarterback and alumnus of Metropolis High School.
 While he doesn't make a physical appearance in Young Justice, he is heard as a radio host of his own radio show, "Steve Lombard Sports Show", in the episode "Evolution", voiced by David Kaye.
 Even though the character doesn't appear on the show, Steve Lombard is mentioned in Superman & Lois. Lois mentions him in the first episode of the first season, "Pilot" as well as the eleventh episode, "A Brief Reminiscence In-Between Cataclysmic Events" when she asks Clark about who told him to wear a tie, guessing it's Lombard.

Film

Animation 
 Steve Lombard appears in All-Star Superman, voiced by Kevin Michael Richardson.
 Steve Lombard appears in Superman: Unbound, voiced by Diedrich Bader. It is implied during a talk with Lois that he suspects Clark is gay; he explains that Clark is secretive about whether he has a girlfriend and has a bodybuilder's physique, but doesn't like sports. Later when Clark proposes to Lois, Steve claims he knew all along the two were romantically involved.
 Steve Lombard appears in the animated films The Death of Superman and Reign of the Supermen, voiced by an uncredited Max Mittelman.

Live-action 
 Michael Kelly portrayed Steve Lombard in Man of Steel. Steve is present at the Battle of Metropolis; when General Zod and his army invade the city, Steve and Perry White try to get coworker Jenny Jurwich out from under the rubble of a building. After Superman saves them, Steve, Perry and Jenny see the starship Black Zero as it is sucked into the Phantom Zone. Near the end, he attempts to ask out Lois and Jenny, but both turn him down.

Miscellaneous
 Though not appearing in the animated series The Batman, Steve Lombard makes a cameo appearance in issue #44 of the spin-off comic The Batman Strikes! in the Daily Planet.

References

External links
Steve Lombard at the Unofficial Guide to the DC Universe
Steve Lombard entry at Supermanica website

Comics characters introduced in 1973
Characters created by Curt Swan
Fictional bullies
Fictional players of American football
Fictional reporters
Superhero film characters
Superman characters